The National Electrical Manufacturers Association (NEMA) defines standards used in North America for various grades of electrical enclosures typically used in industrial applications.  Each is rated to protect against personal access to hazardous parts, and additional type-dependent designated environmental conditions.  A typical NEMA enclosure might be rated to provide protection against environmental hazards such as water, dust, oil or coolant or atmospheres containing corrosive agents such as acetylene or gasoline.  A full list of NEMA enclosure types is available for download from the NEMA website.

Enclosure types 
Below is a list of NEMA enclosure types; these types are further defined in NEMA 250- Enclosures for Electrical Equipment.  Each type specifies characteristics of an enclosure, but not, for example, a specific enclosure size. Note that higher numbers do not include the lower-numbered tests.  For example, types 3, 4 and 6 are intended for outdoor use, but type 5 is not.

A NEMA enclosure rating does not mean that it also meets the same UL enclosure rating.

NFPA is National Fire Protection Association, and NEC is National Electrical Code (U.S.A.)

See also 
 Electrical equipment in hazardous areas
 NEMA connector – Another common, but mostly unrelated, set of standards from NEMA

References 

NEMA standards
Electrical enclosures